Michael A. Lazzara is a North Carolina politician.

Early life and education
Lazzara was born in Palermo, Sicily and raised in Chicago.

Military career
Lazzara served in the United States Marine Corps from 1982 to 1986 and was stationed at Camp Lejeune. He was promoted to corporal.

Career
Lazzara is the owner of Lazzara Pizza Inc. By 2021, Lazzara has been in the pizza industry for 30 years. In 2005, Lazzara first started serving as Mayor Pro Tem of Jacksonville, North Carolina. On the Jacksonville city council, he represented the 3rd ward. Lazzara is chairman of the Jacksonville Tourism Development Authority. In 2020, Mayor Pro Tem Lazzara, along with Chief Michael Yaniero, accepted a Law Enforcement Agency of the Year awarded to the Jacksonville Police Department by the North Carolina Police Executives Association. On November 3, 2020, Lazzara was elected to the North Carolina Senate seat representing the 6th district. He resigned from the city council as result. Lazarra assumed office on January 1, 2021. Lazarra and was sworn in with a virtual ceremony on January 2 alongside George G. Cleveland and Jimmy Dixon due to the COVID-19 pandemic. Lazzara was appointed to three committees in the state senate: Appropriations on General Government, State and Local Government, Education and Judiciary. In January 2021, Lazzara advocated for a state senate bill sponsored by Deanna Ballard that sought to reopen North Carolina schools, with a virtual option, amid the pandemic.

Personal life
Lazzara is Catholic.

References

External links

Living people
American restaurateurs
Businesspeople from Chicago
Businesspeople from North Carolina
Businesspeople from Palermo
Catholics from North Carolina
Italian emigrants to the United States
Military personnel from North Carolina
North Carolina city council members
Republican Party North Carolina state senators
People from Jacksonville, North Carolina
Politicians from Chicago
Politicians from Palermo
United States Marine Corps non-commissioned officers
20th-century American businesspeople
21st-century American businesspeople
21st-century American politicians
Year of birth missing (living people)
American people of Italian descent